2 is an EP by indie folk group Shook Twins. The first single from the EP, "Mad Scientist," was premiered on No Depression in September 2017. The EP premiered on Pop Dust in November 2017.

Track listing

Personnel 
Katelyn Shook - vocals, guitar

Laurie Shook - vocals, banjo

Jim Wilson - Mastering

Blue Rooms Studio - Mixing

References

2017 EPs
Shook Twins albums
Indie folk EPs
EPs by American artists